Julius Seyler (4 May 1873 – 22 or 24 November 1955) was a German painter and athlete.

Selected exhibitions
 1902 erstmals im Glaspalast München (1. Auszeichnung), weiter im Glaspalast in den Jahren 1908, 1909, 1913, 1927, 1928
 1912 Ausstellungen in Dresden, Leipzig und Rotterdam
 1913 The Armory Show in New York (Europäische Impressionisten)
 1922 Galerie Helbig München
 1923 Kunstverein München
 1925 Galerie Thannhauser, Luzern (Schweiz)
 1928 Deutsche Kunst der Gegenwart, Nürnberg
 1943 Maximilianeum, München
 1951 Haus der Deutschen Kunst, München
 1987 C. M. Russel-Museum, Great Falls (Montana)
 1989 Amerika-Haus, München
 1994 Gallery of the Visible Arts, University of Montana, USA
 1999 Museum of the Rockies, Bozeman, Montana, USA and in the Deutsch-Amerikanisches Institut, Heidelberg
 2003 (16. Januar - 9. März) Retrospektive in the Galerie of Bayerischen Landesbank München
 2015 (ab 13. November) Farben. Kunst. Indianer. Der Münchner Impressionist Julius Seyler bei den Blackfeet im Museum Fünf Kontinente in München

References

1873 births
1955 deaths
German artists
German male speed skaters